Watch the Stove (stylized in all caps) is the debut EP album by food brand Hamburger Helper under the alias Helper. It was released on April 1, 2016 through SoundCloud.

Background and release
The idea of a Hamburger Helper album came from a tweet in 2014, where the brand jokingly stated the mascot would release a mixtape. It became the brand's most-favorited tweet.

The EP was released as an April Fools joke by General Mills in collaboration with marketing agency Ketchum Inc. The title references the Jay-Z and Kanye West album Watch the Throne. It subsequently went viral on Twitter. Within a week, the album had 5 million streams on SoundCloud.

Production
The EP was produced by a team at the McNally Smith College of Music and local Minneapolis artists. Two music videos were shot. Songs were required to be family-appropriate and contain no swear words.

Track listing

See also
We Beefin?

References

General Mills
2016 debut EPs
Novelty albums